Sir William Godolphin (1547 – October 1589), of Treveneage in Cornwall, was an English  Member of Parliament. He was the younger son of Thomas Godolphin, Captain (governor) of the Scilly Isles, a member of one of Cornwall's leading families, and his wife Katherine Bonithon; his older brother, Sir Francis, who took over the governorship of the Scillies from their father, was also an MP and Vice-Warden of the Stannaries. Sir William represented Helston, at that period the Godolphin family borough, in the Parliament of 1586–7. He married Jane Gaverigan on 11 December 1587, only shortly before his death. His son, Francis, was MP for St Ives in the Long Parliament.

References

 Burke's Extinct Peerage (London: Henry Colburn & Richard Bentley, 1831) 
 Vivian's Visitations of Cornwall (Exeter: William Pollard & Co, 1887) 
 
Godolphin family tree

1547 births
1589 deaths
English MPs 1586–1587
Members of the pre-1707 English Parliament for constituencies in Cornwall
Politicians from Cornwall
William